Bawantha Udangamuwa (born 1 August 1999) is a Sri Lankan cricketer. He made his Twenty20 debut for Galle Cricket Club in the 2018–19 SLC Twenty20 Tournament on 18 February 2019. He made his List A debut for Galle Cricket Club in the 2018–19 Premier Limited Overs Tournament on 10 March 2019.

References

External links
 

1999 births
Living people
Sri Lankan cricketers
Galle Cricket Club cricketers
Place of birth missing (living people)